Guo Donglin (born 18 October 1966) is a Chinese actor and xiangsheng performer.

He is notable for performing xiangsheng and sketch comedy in CCTV New Year's Gala from 1993 to present.

Biography
Guo was born in Yantai, Shandong in October 1966, both his father Guo Changyi and mother were performing artists, he graduated from Shanghai Theatre Academy.

Works

CCTV New Year's Gala

Television

Film

Drama
 Parisian
 Wedding and Funeral
 The History of Sangshuping
 Hamlet
 Gala Hutong
 Super Idiot
 Haitang Hutong

References

1966 births
Shanghai Theatre Academy alumni
Male actors from Yantai
Living people
Chinese male television actors
Chinese male film actors